Orašac is a village in southern Croatia, administratively located in the City of Dubrovnik. It is located between Trsteno and Zaton, northwest of Dubrovnik.

This village was founded around AD 1040. In the centre of the town the houses are built close to each other. This once was a means of protection from the Narentines. 

There are many old churches (such as the St Nicholas church built in 1250) and chapels, including the Arapovo castle, where the chief magistrate of Florence, the gonfaloniere Piero Soderini is believed to have stayed in 1512–3, before he left for Rome.

During the Croatian War of Independence, the large hotel complex Dubrovački vrtovi sunca was destroyed and was recently reopened.

See also 
Dalmatia

References

External links
 Unofficial site of Orašac
 Photographic Tour of Orašac and Trsteno

Populated places established in the 11th century
Populated places in Dubrovnik-Neretva County